In mathematics, Tarski's theorem, proved by , states that in ZF the theorem "For every infinite set , there is a bijective map between the sets   and " implies the axiom of choice. The opposite direction was already known, thus the theorem and axiom of choice are equivalent.

Tarski told  that when he tried to publish the theorem in Comptes Rendus de l'Académie des Sciences Paris, Fréchet and Lebesgue refused to present it. Fréchet wrote that an implication between two well known propositions is not a new result. Lebesgue wrote that an implication between two false propositions is of no interest.

Proof

The goal is to prove that the axiom of choice is implied by the statement "for every infinite set  ". 
It is known that the well-ordering theorem is equivalent to the axiom of choice; thus it is enough to show that the statement implies that for every set  there exists a well-order.

By the initial assumption,  thus there exists a bijection 

Therefore, there exists at least one ordinal  such that  so the set  is not empty.

We can define a new function:  
This function is well defined since  is a non-empty set of ordinals, and so has a minimum. 

References

 
 
 

Axiom of choice
Cardinal numbers
Set theory
Theorems in the foundations of mathematics

fr:Ordinal de Hartogs#Produit cardinal